Winsley Mines is a 1.48 hectare biological Site of Special Scientific Interest, near the village of Winsley in Wiltshire, England, notified in 1989.

The site is a hibernation roost for the Greater Horseshoe bat, and forms part of the Bath and Bradford-on-Avon Bats Special Area of Conservation.

Sources

 English Nature citation sheet for the site (accessed 31 July 2006)

External links
 English Nature website (SSSI information)
 Winsley Quarries – Bradford on Avon Museum, November 2011

Bat roosts
Sites of Special Scientific Interest in Wiltshire
Sites of Special Scientific Interest notified in 1989